Guanzhou station may refer to:

 Guanzhou station (Guangzhou Metro), a station on Line 4 of the Guangzhou Metro in Guangzhou, Guangdong Province, China.
 Guanzhou station (Nanchang Metro), a station on Line 4 of the Nanchang Metro in Nanchang, Jiangxi Province, China